Ahmed Salama is a Palestinian footballer who plays as a defender.

References 

Living people
1989 births
Palestinian footballers
Palestine international footballers
Footballers at the 2010 Asian Games
Association football defenders
Asian Games competitors for Palestine